The 2013 NHRA Mello Yello Drag Racing Series was announced by the NHRA on August 12, 2012.

There were 24 Top Fuel, Funny Car, and Pro Stock car events, and 16 Pro Stock Motorcycle events scheduled.

Schedule

NOTE: All races will be televised on ESPN or ESPN2.

1 The rules for the 4 Wide Nationals differ from other races:
 All cars will qualify on each lane as all four lanes will be used in qualifying.
 Three rounds with cars using all four lanes.
 In Rounds One and Two, the top two drivers (of four) will advance to the next round.
 The pairings are set as follows:
 Race One:  1, 8, 9, 16
 Race Two:  4, 5, 12, 13
 Race Three:  2, 7, 10, 15
 Race Four:  3, 6, 11, 14
 Semifinal One:  Top two in Race One and Race Two
 Semifinal Two:  Top two in Race Three and Race Four
 Finals:  Top two in Semifinal One and Semifinal Two
 Lane choice determined by times in previous round.  In first round, lane choice determined by fastest times.
 Drivers who advance in Rounds One and Two will receive 20 points for each round advancement.
 In Round Three, the winner of the race will be declared the race winner and will collect 40 points.  The runner-up will receive 20 points.  Third and fourth place drivers will be credited as semifinal losers.

2 Due to heavy rains, the NHRA postponed the Summit Racing Equipment NHRA Southern Nationals until May 10–11.

New drivers
Brittney Force, daughter of John Force, made her NHRA debut driving in Top Fuel for John Force Racing.

Notable events
New England Dragway has been added to the NHRA schedule with the New England Nationals, and featuring all four Professional race categories. Morgan Lucas announces he will exit the cockpit of his dragster after the season's end, to attend to future family business.

Points standings

References

External links
 Official website
 Official NHRA Drag Racing Podcasts
 Drag Race Central The Latest NHRA News and Analysis

NHRA Mello Yello
NHRA Mello Yello